Borovinka is a rural locality (a village)  in Cheryomushskoye Rural Settlement of Kotlassky District, Arkhangelsk Oblast, Russia. The population was 3 as of 2010.

Geography 
Borovinka is located 22 km south of Kotlas (the district's administrative centre) by road. Vystavka is the nearest rural locality.

References 

Rural localities in Kotlassky District